This is a table of the total federal tax revenue by state, federal district, and territory collected by the U.S. Internal Revenue Service.

Gross Collections indicates the total federal tax revenue collected by the IRS from each U.S. state, the District of Columbia, and Puerto Rico. The figure includes all Individual federal taxes and Corporate Federal Taxes, income taxes, payroll taxes, estate taxes, gift taxes, and excise taxes. This table does not include federal tax revenue data from U.S. Armed Forces personnel stationed overseas, U.S. territories other than Puerto Rico, and U.S. citizens and legal residents living abroad, even though they may be required to pay federal taxes.


Fiscal Year 2019
This table lists the tax revenue collected from each state, plus the District of Columbia and the territory of Puerto Rico by the IRS in fiscal year 2019, which ran from October 1, 2018, through September 30, 2019. The gross collections total only reflects the revenue collected from the categories listed in the table, and not the entire revenue collected by the IRS.

No data for Guam is available for 2019.

Fiscal Year 2018
This table lists the tax revenue collected from each state, plus the District of Columbia and the territory of Puerto Rico by the IRS in fiscal year 2018, which ran from October 1, 2017, through September 30, 2018. The gross collections total only reflects the revenue collected from the categories listed in the table, and not the entire revenue collected by the IRS.

No data for Guam is available for 2018.

Fiscal Year 2017
This table lists the tax revenue collected from each state, plus the District of Columbia and the territory of Puerto Rico by the IRS in fiscal year 2018, which ran from October 1, 2016, through September 30, 2017. The gross collections total only reflects the revenue collected from the categories listed in the table, and not the entire revenue collected by the IRS.

No data for Guam is available for 2017.

Fiscal Year 2015
This table lists the tax revenue collected from each state, plus the District of Columbia and the territory of Puerto Rico by the IRS in fiscal year 2015, which ran from October 1, 2014, through September 30, 2015. The gross collections total only reflects the revenue collected from the categories listed in the table, and not the entire revenue collected by the IRS. Per capita values are based on population estimates from the Census Bureau for July 1, 2015.

GSP is the Gross State Product

Fiscal Year 2012
This table lists the tax revenue collected from each state, plus the District of Columbia and the territory of Puerto Rico by the IRS in fiscal year 2012, which ran from October 1, 2011, through September 30, 2012. The gross collections total only reflects the revenue collected from the categories listed in the table, and not the entire revenue collected by the IRS. Per capita values are based on population estimates from the Census Bureau for July 1, 2012.

GSP is the Gross State Product

Fiscal Year 2011
This table lists the tax revenue collected from each state, plus the District of Columbia and the territory of Puerto Rico by the IRS in fiscal year 2011, which ran from October 1, 2010, through September 30, 2011. The gross collections total only reflects the revenue collected from the categories listed in the table, and not the entire revenue collected by the IRS. Per capita values are based on population estimates from the Census Bureau for July 1, 2011.

Maps and graphs

See also
Federal taxation and spending by state

Federal taxes:
Income tax in the United States

State taxes:
State tax levels in the United States
State income tax
Sales taxes in the United States

General:
Taxation in the United States

Notes

Citations

New table is available for 2015 to update the data. Also - would be good to be able to see some trends in the data in terms of growth by state in terms of taxes paid

References
 2007 Population, US Census.
 Total Tax Revenue By Type and State Fiscal Year 2007 (XLS)

Taxation in the United States
Tax incidence